Felix Bastians (born 9 May 1988) is a German professional footballer who plays as a centre-back or left-back for Regionalliga West club Rot-Weiss Essen.

Club career

Early career
Bastians began his career with SG Wattenscheid 09 and VfL Bochum before moving to Borussia Dortmund. In November 2003 at 15 years old he signed for English club Nottingham Forest.

England
Bastians spent most of his time in England on the bench. He played as a defensive midfielder in the earlier stages of his career, always managing to get up for corners and head the ball goalways. Forest boss Colin Calderwood named him as an upcoming talent and already a huge asset to the club. He had a successful debut, assisting a goal in Forest's 3–2 defeat against Woking in the Football League Trophy in November 2005.

He joined Northwich Victoria on loan from Nottingham Forest in November 2006, scoring once in four appearances. He then joined Gillingham on 22 March 2007 on a loan until the end of the 2006–07 season. He made his Gillingham debut in the 5–0 away defeat to Carlisle United on 24 March 2007 and scored his first goal in a 3–2 away defeat to Rotherham United on 7 April 2007.

Bastians was part of the successful Forest reserve side who won the Pontins Holiday League Championship title for the 2006–07 season, beating Rotherham 2–0 in the play-off final, Bastians scored a number of goals throughout the season to help his side lift the title.

He joined Chesterfield on a month's loan in October 2007. He impressed in his spell at Chesterfield, scoring one goal in thirteen appearances. His loan spell there ended on 2 January 2008. Bastians signed for Notts County two days later on a month's loan. On 14 February 2008, he joined another League Two club, MK Dons, once again on a month's loan. He later returned to The Reds, but failed to earn himself a new deal at the club and was released by mutual consent by manager Colin Calderwood on 21 May 2008.

Bastians ended his forest career having played 33 games and scoring five goals in the process. He is the third youngest player ever to play for Forest, behind Gary Mills and Craig Westcarr.

Young Boys Bern
Bastians moved to Swiss Super League side Young Boys Bern in 2008. On 10 August 2008, he scored his first goal for his new team, the equaliser in a 2–1 win against Neuchâtel Xamax in front of over 16,000 supporters at the Stade de Suisse in Bern.

SC Freiburg
After just one year with Young Boys Bern he left on 7 July 2009 in order to transfer to SC Freiburg. At Freiburg, Bastians swapped his position from a winger to a defender, being mainly used as a centre back alongside Pavel Krmaš.

Hertha BSC
On 28 January 2012, Bastians completed a move to Hertha BSC which would see him there until the summer of 2016.

VfL Bochum
In June 2013, he was loaned out to Bochum. After the loan spell, Bastians returned to Hertha Berlin. On 9 October 2014, Hertha released him. On 17 November 2014, VfL Bochum announced the signing of Bastians starting 1 January 2015.

Tianjin Teda
In January 2018 he moved to Tianjin Teda in the Chinese Super League who, managed by countryman Uli Stielike whose daughter is reportedly married to Bastian's brother, paid around €1 million for his services.

International career
Bastians represented Germany at U18, U19 and U21 international levels.

Career statistics

References

External links
 
 
 

1988 births
Living people
Sportspeople from Bochum
German footballers
Footballers from North Rhine-Westphalia
Association football central defenders
Association football fullbacks
Germany under-21 international footballers
Germany youth international footballers
English Football League players
Swiss Super League players
Bundesliga players
2. Bundesliga players
Regionalliga players
Chinese Super League players
Nottingham Forest F.C. players
Northwich Victoria F.C. players
Halifax Town A.F.C. players
Gillingham F.C. players
Chesterfield F.C. players
Milton Keynes Dons F.C. players
BSC Young Boys players
SC Freiburg players
VfL Bochum players
Hertha BSC players
Hertha BSC II players
Tianjin Jinmen Tiger F.C. players
S.K. Beveren players
Rot-Weiss Essen players
German expatriate footballers
German expatriate sportspeople in England
Expatriate footballers in England
German expatriate sportspeople in Switzerland
Expatriate footballers in Switzerland
German expatriate sportspeople in China
Expatriate footballers in China
German expatriate sportspeople in Belgium
Expatriate footballers in Belgium